XHRPC-FM is a radio station on 99.3 FM in Chihuahua City, Chihuahua. It is owned by Grupo Radiorama and carries its La Bestia Grupera grupera format.

History
XHRPC received its concession in 1961 as XERPC-AM 1420, owned by Radio T.V. Parral, S.A. It was sold to the Uranga family operating as Red Nacional Radioemisora in 1967; the move to 790 came not long after. Radiorama would later acquire the station, and it is currently operated by Grupo Audiorama, a related company.

References

Radio stations in Chihuahua
Mass media in Chihuahua City